Philippe Adam (December 7, 1886 – October 5, 1963) was a Canadian provincial politician. He was the Union Nationale member of the Legislative Assembly of Quebec for Bagot from 1938 to 1939. He was also mayor of Vale, Quebec from 1934 to 1940.

References

1886 births
1963 deaths
Mayors of places in Quebec
People from Saint-Hyacinthe
Union Nationale (Quebec) MNAs
Burials at Notre Dame des Neiges Cemetery